NoujeDeh (also known as Novādi, Novady, Nowqadī, and Nūrī) is a village in Guney-ye Sharqi Rural District, in the Central District of Shabestar County, East Azerbaijan Province, Iran. At the 2016 census, its population was 859, in 310 families.

References 

Populated places in Shabestar County